Mangelia carinata is a species of sea snail, a marine gastropod mollusk in the family Mangeliidae.

Description
The length of the shell attains 6.6 mm.

Distribution
This marine species occurs off Madagascar.

References

 Bozzetti, L., 2009. Genere Mangelia Risso, 1826 (Gastropoda: Hypsogastropoda: Conidae, Mangeliinae). Due nuove specie dal Madagascar meridionale. Malacologia Mostra Mondiale 63: 10–12

External links
 
 MNHN, Paris : Mangelia carinata (holotype)

carinata
Gastropods described in 2009